Arthur Trevor (24 December 1738 – 19 June 1770) was an Irish politician.

He was MP for Hillsborough from 1761 to 1770.

References

1738 births
1770 deaths
Members of the Parliament of Ireland (pre-1801) for County Down constituencies
Irish MPs 1761–1768
Irish MPs 1769–1776